Kaiyethum Doorath is a 2002 Indian Malayalam-language romance film written, directed and produced by Fazil. The film was the acting debut of Fazil's son Fahadh (credited as Shaanu) who co-starred with Nikita Thukral. Mammootty appeared in a cameo role. It was an onam release.

Plot

Sachin Madhavan alias Sachu is a talented young gentleman who comes to a hill station for a short-term Computer course. He plans to stay with a distant relative, Prof. Sadasivan. The Professor welcomes and invites him for a birthday party on the first day. When Sachu leaves for shopping he meets a girl Sushma and falls love with her prima facie. They meet again in the birthday party and sing and dance together. On his way back home Sachu comes across Kundara Sharangan who is the paramour of Miss Vasundhara.

Later Sachu is approached by Sushma and friends for a helping hand in the dance competition they are about to perform. They fear of a hijack, as the judge of the program, Mr. Kundara Sharangan, has been bribed by the captain of their rival team. Sachu promises to help them. He knavishly takes a photo of Kundara Sharangan's and Vasundhara's illicit relationship. Sachu shows it and threatens him that, he will reveal his secrets if he acts not honestly in making the verdict in the contest. Sachu composes a mindblowing song and impressive steps for his friends and Sushma's team taste victory. Sachu tells about his stardust on Sushma to Appunni, who is a travelling salesman of home-made sweets and pickles. Later Sushma comes and greets Sachu for his staggering attitude. Sachu demands a beautiful evening of Sushma. Tony, one among the crew of Sushma sees this meeting and is suspicious. He informs this to others.

Later, Sachu learns from Prof. Sadasivan that Sushma stays with her aunt and comes from a broken family. Her father Babunath and mother Dr. Omana Babunath are well settled, said to be separated and living abroad. They want to legally get divorced after their only daughter gets married. They have found Dr. Kishore, who works in the US as Sushma's future life-partner. Any how Sachin loves her deeply but never reveals his feeling. They again meet in a restaurant and Sachu tries not to express his feelings. Sushma's friends secretly watches it and they make sure that Sachu and Sushma nurtures an affair. Both become great friends and they share a very special relationship.

Sushma's aunt develops doubts about the nexus between them and she informs this to Sushma's mother Dr. Omana. She arrives from Kuwait for Sushma's engagement. Sushma however agrees for the marriage and demands her father's presence in the function.
But Dr. Omana's lukewarmness tends Sushma to tell, she and Sachu is in an affair. It heats up Dr. Omana's emotions and she detains her. Dr. Omana and her brother Hari warns Sachu not to indulge with Sushma. They run away with the help of Sachins friends and stay somewhere away from home. Slowly Sushma too starts falling in love with Sachin.

One day, an advocate Gopi comes to see them and agrees to help them. He tells Sachin the truth that Sushmas father is dying of some bone marrow disease and his last wish is to see his daughter married to the guy whom he has selected. So he hands over Sushma to her mother. The story is told in a flashback when Sachin is on his way to attend his lovers marriage as he tells his past to the co-passengers on a ferryboat who gets hooked on to his love story. What happens at the marriage forms the twist in this love story.

Cast

Fahadh Faasil as Sachin Madhavan (credited as Shaanu)
Nikitha as Sushma
Mammootty as Adv. Gopinath (cameo appearance)
Rajan P. Dev as Prof. Sadasivan
Revathy as Dr. Omana Babunath
Siddique as Babunath
Sudheesh as Tony
Harishree Ashokan as Appunni
Cochin Haneefa as Kundara Sharangan
Janardanan as Passenger in the boat
Augustine as Passenger in the boat
K. P. A. C. Lalitha as Bhanumathi
Yadukrishnan as Vijayaraghavan
Narayanankutty as Passenger in the boat
Vishnu Prasad as Hari
Jolly Easo as Ramani
 Soubin Shahir as Bus Passenger (uncredited role)
Abhinay

Prithviraj Sukumaran and Asin had initially auditioned for the roles ultimately played by Fahadh Faasil and Nikita Thukral respectively.

Production
During the making of the film, Fazil had contemplated remaking the film in Tamil with Madhavan in the lead role, but later opted against the idea.

Music

References

External links
 

2002 films
2000s Malayalam-language films
Films scored by Ouseppachan
Indian romance films
2000s romance films